Thomas Hollis (1659 – January 21, 1731) was a wealthy English merchant and a benefactor of Harvard University.

Benefactions
As a Baptist and a Calvinist, Hollis required his donations to be used for directed purposes. For example, in 1721, he established the Hollis Chair of Divinity at Harvard, with a salary of £80 per year, with the stipulation that Baptists be included for consideration. This broadening constituted a form of dissent from strict adherence to the orthodoxy of the day, where New England's reform Protestantism was being buffeted by ripples and uncertainties generated by the Glorious Revolution of 1688/9. In 1726, he also endowed the Hollis Chair of Mathematics and Natural Philosophy with the same amount. Hollis also convinced his younger brothers, John and Nathaniel, to contribute substantially to Harvard and thus helped establish a legacy of civil and religious liberty across the Massachusetts Bay Colony decades before the American Revolution.

Legacy
The town of Holliston, Massachusetts, is named for him; as is HOLLIS, the Harvard On-Line Library Information System.

Notes

References

Further reading

External links

Harvard On-Line Library Information System (HOLLIS)

1659 births
1731 deaths
Harvard University people
Hollis Chair of Mathematics and Natural Philosophy
Date of birth unknown
Holliston, Massachusetts
English merchants